The 2022–23 EFL League One (referred to as the Sky Bet League One for sponsorship reasons) is the 19th season of the Football League One under its current title and the 31st season under its current league division format. The season began on 30 July 2022 and is scheduled to end in early May 2023.

Team changes 

The following teams have changed division since the 2021–22 season:

Stadiums

Personnel and sponsoring

  Barnsley's shirt sponsor was HEX.com until 12 August 2022 when the deal was ended prematurely. The club subsequently announced that various local companies and charities would feature on the shirt throughout the season.

  Derby County had no shirt sponsor until 8 November 2022 when they gifted shirt sponsorship to the charity NSPCC.

Managerial changes

League table

Results

Season statistics

Top scorers

Top assists

Hat-tricks

Monthly awards

References 

EFL League One seasons
3
England
Current association football seasons